Filatima frugalis is a moth of the family Gelechiidae. It is found in North America, where it has been recorded from Utah and Texas.

The larvae feed on Amelanchier alnifolia.

References

Moths described in 1925
Filatima